Kamień Pomorski is a railway station in the town of Kamień Pomorski, West Pomeranian Voivodeship, Poland. The station lies on the Wysoka Kamieńska–Trzebiatów railway. The train services are operated by Przewozy Regionalne.

Train services
The station is served by the following services:

Regional services (R) Kamien Pomorski - Wysota Kamienska - Szczecin

External links

Railway stations in West Pomeranian Voivodeship
Kamień County